Trinity Lutheran Church is a historic church near Atkins, Arkansas.  It is located east of Winrock and north of Petit Jean State Park, on the east side of Montgomery Trace (County Highway 5).  It is a wooden plank-framed structure, with a weatherboard exterior, gabled roof, and cut fieldstone foundation.  Its front facade is unadorned except for the entrance, which is simply framed, and the sides each have three sash windows.  The interior has original finishes and simple hand-hewn pews.  The church was built in 1886, and is one of the oldest Lutheran churches in Arkansas.

The building was listed on the National Register of Historic Places in 1976.

See also
National Register of Historic Places listings in Conway County, Arkansas

References

Lutheran churches in Arkansas
Churches on the National Register of Historic Places in Arkansas
Churches completed in 1886
Churches in Conway County, Arkansas
National Register of Historic Places in Conway County, Arkansas
1886 establishments in Arkansas